Anna Boleyn, also known as Deception, is a 1920 German historical film directed by Ernst Lubitsch. It stars Henny Porten as Anne Boleyn and Emil Jannings as King Henry VIII.

The film was produced by Paul Davidson's Union Film, a subsidiary of the giant German company UFA. It was shot at the Tempelhof Studios in Berlin. The film's sets were designed by the art director Kurt Richter. The film cost an estimated 8 million marks to make, but was able to recoup this from the sale of the American rights alone which brought in $200,000 (14 million marks).

Cast

Reception
Anna Boleyn was among Mary Pickford's favorite films, calling it "an example of superb direction and splendid acting, especially that of Emil Jannings. It was the first time on the screen that a King had been made human. It has subtle, satirical humor."

Home media
The film was released in the US by Kino Lorber as part of the box set "Lubitsch in Berlin" in 2005–2007 with English intertitles. It was also released in the UK by Eureka's Masters of Cinema series as part of the box set "Lubitsch in Berlin: Fairy-Tales, Melodramas, and Sex Comedies" in 2010 with German intertitles and English subtitles.

See also
Anne Boleyn in popular culture

References

Bibliography

External links

1920 films
1920s biographical films
1920s historical films
Cultural depictions of Anne Boleyn
Cultural depictions of Catherine of Aragon
German black-and-white films
Films about Henry VIII
Films directed by Ernst Lubitsch
Films of the Weimar Republic
Films set in the 1530s
Films set in Tudor England
German biographical films
German epic films
German historical films
German silent feature films
Epic films based on actual events
Historical epic films
UFA GmbH films
Films shot at Tempelhof Studios
Silent adventure films
1920s German films